Hosea  is a genus of flowering plant in the family Lamiaceae, first described in 1908. It contains only one known species, Hosea lobbii. It is endemic to the Island of Borneo (Sultanate of Brunei + Sarawak region of Malaysia).

References

Lamiaceae

Endemic flora of Borneo
Plants described in 1885